Prince Naga (d. 9 July 715) was a Japanese prince. He was the son of Emperor Tenmu and Princess Ōe, daughter of Emperor Tenji. His full brother was Prince Yuge.

Career 
In the seventh year of Emperor Jito's rule (693) together with his brother Prince Yuge, he was conferred the rank of Kiyohiro 2 (equivalent to Sanhon). He became Nihon through the transition to the court rank system accompanying the enactment of the Taiho Code in 701.

Later, from the Monmu Dynasty to the Gen Ming Dynasty, 200 fudo were given in the first year of Keiun (704) and the seventh year of Wado (714). Among the princes of Emperor Tenmu, he had good lineage with his grandfather being Emperor Tenchi, and it was possible that he would be appointed Chidajokanji after Imperial Prince Hozumi, but he was appointed a month before Imperial Prince Hozumi. In the eighth year of the Wado era (715), he passed away on June 4. Though his age at death is unknown, judging from the timing of the birth of his daughter Princess Chinu, it is estimated that he was in his mid-forties to early fifties. 

There is a theory that he was buried in the Kitora Tomb.

Family 
Parents
Father: Emperor Tenmu (天武天皇, c. 631 – 1 October 686)
Mother: Princess Ōe (大江皇女), Emperor Tenji’s daughter
Full Brother: Prince Yuge (弓削皇子, 673 – 21 August 699)
Consort and issues
Unknown wife
First Son: Prince Kawachi (河内王, d. 733)
Second Son: Prince Kurisu (栗栖王, 682 – 6 November 753)
Third Son: Prince Chinu (智努王), later Funya no Kiyomi (文室 浄三, 693 – 9 October 770) 
Fourth Son: Prince Ishikawa (石川王)
Fifth Son: Prince Nagata (長田王)
Sixth Son: Prince Oichi (大市王, 704 – 28 December 780) later Bunko Oichi (文室大市)
Seventh Son: Prince Nara (奈良王)
Eight Son: Prince Kayanuma (茅沼王)
Ninth Son: Prince Atoda (阿刀王, d. 22 July 763)
First Daughter: Princess Hirose (広瀬女王, d. 9 November 765)
Second Daughter: Princess Chinu (智努女王)

Japanese princes
715 deaths
Year of birth unknown
Sons of emperors
8th-century Japanese people
Emperor Tenmu

Further reading